Orchis punctulata, the small-dotted orchis, is a species of orchid. It is native to southeastern Europe (Greece, the part of Turkey in Europe known as East Thrace, and possibly Bulgaria), Crimea in eastern Europe, western Asia (Cyprus, East Aegean Islands, Iran, Iraq, Lebanon, Syria, Palestine, and Turkey), and both the North Caucasus and Transcaucasia.

References 

punctulata
Orchids of Europe
Flora of the Caucasus
Flora of Western Asia